The Irish National Cycling Championships are annual cycling races to decide the Irish cycling champion for several disciplines, across several categories of rider.

The men's road championship is usually held on a Sunday at end of June; the women's race is held the previous day. The winning élite rider wears the national champion's jersey for all road races in the following 12 months. The men's under-23 champion is awarded to the first under-23 in the élite race. The junior road races are held on the same day as the élite and the time-trial championship is earlier in the week. The national criteriums are later in the summer.

Medals

National Championships

Other medals
Courtesy Quay Cycles, Drogheda

Road Race

Amateur Senior Men

Elite/Senior Men

Professional men

Amateur Women

Elite Women

Women Under 23 (Espoir)

Men Under 23 (Espoir)

Junior Men

Junior Women (Under 18)

Time Trial

Amateur Men

Elite Men

Amateur Women

Elite Women

Under 23 Men (Espoir)

Junior Men

Junior Women (Under 18)

Tandem men

Track racing 

1875–1905: Richard J. Mecredy, Arthur du Cros, Charlie Pease, Bob Reynolds 9 Championships each,
Harry Reynolds 5 Championships,
R. Hassard 6 Championships

25ml track: 1889: Arthur du Cros; 1890 & 1891 R.J. Mecredy; 1895: Harry Large; 1896: Harry Reynolds; 1909 Sam Cochrane; 1924 Culvenor Gibson.

50ml track: 1876: H.H. Law; 1896: M.S. Walsh;

1890s R.J. Mecredy won the 2nd 100ml championship

Inter Club Team Championship: 1886, 1887: Leinster C.C.

1895 track: J. Mackey

1896 &1898 L.R. Oswald-Healy of DUBC won an Irish championship

1904 motor paced: Harry Mussen

440yds, 880yds, 1ml, 2ml, 3ml, 4ml.

5ml; 5ml Pt. to Pt.; 10ml; 500m; 1,000m; 2,000m

3,000m; 5,000m; 6,000m; 7,000m; 8,000m; 10,000m

10,000m Pt. to Pt,; 3/4ml; 6ml; 4,000m; 8ml;

1962 5,000m point to point: Dan Ahearne

Sprint; 1km TT; Pursuit; Points

Junior: 1,000m; 1 mile; 5,000m; 5 miles; Others

Mountain bike

Elite/Senior Cross Country (XC) & Downhill (DH)

Junior Cross Country (XC) & Downhill (DH)

Veterans & Masters

Expert & Sport & U23

Marathon XC

Hill Climb

Criterium

Cyclo-Cross

Elite/Senior Men

Elite/Senior Women

Notes
The Irish National Cycling Championships are annual cycling races to decide the Irish cycling champion for several disciplines, across several categories of rider. Through the years there have been new championships added and older championships dropped as social and sporting attitudes changed.

Track
Up to the late 1960s the distances for track championships were affected by economic factors. Combined athletic and cycling meetings were held in every part of the country and attracted large attendances, the outstanding cyclists of the day were household names. This led to the organisers of meetings demanding a championship (county, provincial or national) to attract bigger gates. The number of championships was increased to meet this demand and this has created difficulties in compiling these lists because one cannot be sure that the absence of a result for an event is due to lack of research or the fact that the event did not take place in a particular year. There were, of course, core distances that were regularly raced for many years. No matter what the motive for putting them on the calendar these championships were keenly contested and the winners are due as much respect as those who won the events that have persisted through the years.

Championships were raced on a mixture of hard surfaces and on grass depending on where they were held.  Championships were not designated as grass track or hard track but rather as distances.

After the late 1960s the "local" began to die in Ireland. Sports meetings faded out with showbands. People became less interested in going down the road to see local heroes when they could sit at home and look into the pores of the best competitors in the world on television. This brought a contraction in the number of track championships back to the core distances and disciplines.

Road
Road racing was less affected by economics and fashion. Time trials have been a feature since the earliest days. It should be remembered that time trials became so popular in the United Kingdom because cycle racing on the open road was illegal. Riders wore sports jackets and tights as part of the strategy to avoid detection and prosecution. Once independence was achieved in part of Ireland time trialling escaped from these stifling rules and gradually massed start road racing became popular and championships were held.

The classic time trial distances were 25, 50 and 100 miles and 12 and 24 hours. From the early 1960s the longer events faded away. Although the 25 miles remained on the books there was sometimes a slight variation in the distance and out and home courses were not always used.

Massed start championships for men were initially held at more than one distance each year but by the early 1960s settled into one event of at least 100 miles/160 km.

Categories
Racing as recorded in Ireland was almost completely amateur and no professional stand-alone championships were ever held. When the Olympic Games abandoned the amateur ruling, cycling internationally adopted a system of over 23 Elite and under 23 with no distinction between amateurs and professionals.

Junior racing
The term "Junior" has had many meanings. At one time the gradings were Novice (who had not won 3 prizes), Junior (who had won 3 prizes) and Senior (who had gained a place in the first three in a Senior championship). Later "Junior" meant under 18 on a particular date. There were occasional "Youths" championships which at one time meant under 20 years on a specified date but this may not have been consistent.

Women's racing
Women's racing goes back to at least the 1930s but only a small number of championships are recorded before the 1980s.

Organisations
At various times there was more than one body organising cycling in Ireland and each promoted their own championship. These are all regarded as being of equal merit in this listing.

The overlaps are:
 1900s,10s and 20s :Irish Cycling Association (ICA) <> Gaelic Athletic Association (GAA);
 1936 to 1940: National Athletic & Cycling Association (NACA) <> Cumann Rothuideachta na hÉireann (CRE);
 1950 to 1967:Cumann Rothuideachta na hÉireann (CRE) & Northern Ireland Cycling Federation (NICF) <> National Cycling Association of Ireland (NCA);
 1967 to 1979: Irish Cycling Federation (ICF) & NICF <> NCA

References

Other external sources
Information not referenced above was gleaned from:
 NCA 21st Birthday Book published by Kerry Sloane which listed NCA championships between 1938 and 1959.
 1978 NCA Racing Calendar which repeated some of the above list and brought it up to that date with some anomalies.
 NICF Year Books between 1950 and 1975, with some gaps, provided by Jack Watson and examined by Rory Wyley.
 Cycling Ireland Year Books 1988 to 2012, examined by Rory Wyley.
 The Cyclist and The Irish Cyclist volumes from 1934 to 1940 in the National Library of Ireland.
 The Irish Cyclist files in the archives of the Royal Irish Automobile Club in the care of Bob Montgomery: November 1890 – May 1891, June–October 1891, Jan–March 1898, April–June 1898, 1898–1899, July–December 1906, July–December 1908, The Wheelman 1902
 Major input from Cyril Smyth, chairman, Dublin University Central Athletic Club.
 Dundalk A Cycling History by Kevin Dolan; no ISBN

External links
 Irish Cycling Championships - Official Site
 2009 National Road Race Results - Elite, U23, Junior
 2008 National Road Race Results - Elite, U23, Junior
 2002 National Road Race Results - Elite Men, Women
 2001 National Road Race Results - Elite, Junior
 2000 National Road Race Results - Elite, Junior
 CQ site - National Championships Ireland R.R
 CQ site - National Championships Ireland I.T.T

National road cycling championships
Cycle races in Ireland
Recurring sporting events established in 1875
National cyclo-cross championships
Cycling